Mavis Ngallametta (also known as Waal-Waal Ngallametta), née Marbunt, was an Indigenous Australian painter and weaver. She was a Putch clan elder and a cultural leader of the Wik and Kugu people of Aurukun, Cape York Peninsula, Far North Queensland. Her work is held in national and state collections, including the National Gallery of Australia, Canberra; Art Gallery of New South Wales, Sydney; Art Gallery of South Australia, Adelaide and Gallery of Modern Art, Brisbane.

Early life and education 
Ngallametta was removed from her family at the age of five and grew up in the dormitories of Aurukun Mission. She maintained connections with her family, learning to weave dilly bags and fruit bowls, made from cabbage palm and pandanus, from her mother and aunty.

Career 
Mavis Ngallametta was initially recognised for her mastery of weaving in traditional materials. While attending a workshop at the Wik and Kugu Art Centre, run by Gina Allain, she began making small paintings depicting important cultural sites. Larger paintings refer to the changing seasons as well as specific sites including Ikalath, where she collected the white clay Yalgamungken, for the vibrant local ochres; her traditional country, the coastal side of Kendall River, which she was able to view from the air; Wutan, a camping site belonging to her adopted son Edgar; and various pamp, or swamps,  around Aurukun. Ngallametta painted with traditional materials, including ochres, clays and charcoal, which she collected herself. Between 2011 and 2019, she created 46 monumental paintings. According to Sally Butler: "nearly every major public and private art collection in Australia" acquired one of these large-scale paintings between 2011 and 2014.

Work

Major exhibitions 
Queensland Art Gallery | Gallery of Modern Art is hosting the first major retrospective of Ngallametta's work in 21 March – 2 August 2020.

Public and private collections 
 National Gallery of Australia, Canberra
 Art Gallery of New South Wales, Sydney
 Art Gallery of South Australia, Adelaide 
 Queensland Art Gallery | Gallery of Modern Art, Brisbane
 Griffith University, Brisbane
 University of Queensland, Brisbane
 Parliament House Collection, Canberra (Bushfire at Ngak-Pungarichan, 2013)
 The Pat Corrigan Collection
 Holmes à Court Collection
 The Ray Wilson Collection
 The Kerry Stokes Collection
 The Wesfarmers Collection

Awards and nominations 
 2004 Community  Arts Achievement Award, Western Cape College, Weipa, Queensland
 2013 Telstra General Painting Award

Australia Council for the Arts 
The Australia Council for the Arts is the arts funding and advisory body for the Government of Australia. Since 1993, it has awarded a Red Ochre Award. It is presented to an outstanding Indigenous Australian (Aboriginal Australian or Torres Strait Islander) artist for lifetime achievement.

|-
| 2018
| herself
| Red Ochre Award
| 
|-

References

Further reading 
 Aurukun Artists: Yuk Wiy Min (Wood and Other Things), Andrew Baker Art Dealer, Brisbane, 2009 [ex. cat.]
 Aurukun Artists: Wiy min yumpan ngamp (We made all this), Andrew Baker Art Dealer, Brisbane, 2008 [ex.  cat.]
 Butler, Sally (ed) Before Time today, Reinventing Tradition in Aurukun Aboriginal Art, 2010, University of  Queensland Press, St Lucia.
 Demozay, Marion. Gatherings II, 2006, Keeaira Press, Southport.
 Albert, Tony, "New creation in Aurukun Ceremonial Art", in Blak On Blak, Artlink, 2010, Volume 30.1.
 Parkes, Brian (editor). Woven Forms: Contemporary basket making in Australia, Object: Australian Centre for Craft and  Design, Surry Hills, NSW, 2005 [ex. cat.]

External links 
 QAGOMA: Explore the work of Mavis Ngallametta
 The Design Files
 Mavis Ngallametta is causing a quiet stampede in the art market

20th-century Australian women artists
20th-century Australian artists
1944 births
2019 deaths
Indigenous Australian artists